Songs from the Mardi Gras is the third and last solo album of former Undertones singer Feargal Sharkey and was released in early 1991 on Virgin Records. Despite the somewhat non-commercial character of the music, the single "I've Got News for You" did make it into the UK Top 20.

Speaking of the album and decision to finish his solo career afterwards, Sharkey told The Telegraph in 2013: "It's gonna sound quite kind of pathetic in many ways, but it was what I was feeling at the time; the last album I made emotionally I put a colossal amount into it, and I just felt I could not go on making that kind of intellectual and emotional investment anymore."

Critical reception

Upon release, Adam Sweeting of The Guardian wrote: "Despite the nostril-assailing whiff of career-calculation, Songs from the Mardi Gras is at least a good deal better than its predecessor, the deplorable Wish." Hi-Fi News & Record Review considered the album to "prove that the days of The Undertones are wiped from [Sharkey's] memory and he is definitely a man of the world - money-minded, star-struck and shallow." They concluded: "Songs from the Mardi Gras is about as intelligent a title as the lyrics on this album deserve." Barry McIlheney of Q described it as "determinedly grown-up and quite frantic in its attempt to be easy listening".

Track listing

Personnel
 Feargal Sharkey - vocals
 Dann Huff, Dennis Morgan, Kenny Greenberg, Kevin Armstrong, Reggie Young - guitar
 Don Potter - acoustic guitar
 Michael Rhodes - bass
 Barry Beckett, Mike Lawler - keyboards
 Eddie Bayers - drums
 Charles Rose, Jim Horn, Mike Haynes, Quitman Dennis - horns
 Beverley Skeete, Bob DiPiero, Greg Barnhill, Janice Hoyte, John Scott Sherrill, Johnny Cobb, Jonell Mosser, Kathy Burdick, Lisa Silver, Vicki Hampton - background vocals
Technical
 Alan Beukers - front cover photography

Charts

References 

1991 albums
Feargal Sharkey albums
Albums produced by Barry Beckett
Virgin Records albums